Amen was a social networking service.

About
Noted for its addictive, mad lib-like feel and ability to create structured data, Amen has received attention, having been selected as one of Venturebeat's top 5 favorites from TechCrunch Disrupt 2011.

"You fire up the app on the iPhone or web browser and say a person, place or thing is “the best” or “the worst” ever, like like, the Best Dubstep track ever...You can agree with this statement with an “Amen”. But with a “Hell no” you have to suggest an alternative answer. It's a rigid structure, but you can post whatever you want."
.

History
Amen was started in February 2011 by Felix Petersen, Florian Weber and Caitlin Winner. Seed round investors include Index and A Grade. In August 2013, Amen was bought by tape.tv. In February 2015 tape.tv announced the shut down of the platform.

See also
 State

References

External links 

 

Defunct social networking services
Internet properties established in 2011
2011 establishments in Germany
German social networking websites